Siegfried Graber was an Italian luger who competed in the early 1970s. A natural track luger, he won a gold medal in the men's doubles event at the 1971 FIL European Luge Natural Track Championships in Vandans, Austria.

References
Natural track European Championships results 1970-2006.

Year of birth missing
Possibly living people
Missing middle or first names
Sportspeople from Südtirol
Italian male lugers